The 2013–14 Granada CF season was the 80th season in club history and the 20th in the top-flight of Spanish football.

Matches

Legend

La Liga

Copa del Rey

Squad

Squad, matches played and goals scored

Minutes played

Starting 11

Bookings

Sources

Granada CF
Granada CF seasons